Joyce Paul (1937 – February 15, 2016) was an American country music singer. She is best known for her 1969 hit on the Billboard Hot Country Songs charts,  "Phone Call to Mama" from her album Heartaches, Laughter & Tears.

She was born in Shelbyville, Tennessee and raised in Nashville, Tennessee.

Paul's other singles were "Do Right Woman – Do Right Man", "I’ve Loved Him Much Longer Than You", "I'm the Girl on the Billboard".
Among her producers were Bob Montgomery and  Kelso Herston on United Artists Records.

She died in 2016 in Roseville, Minnesota, at the age of 78.

References

External links
Joyce Paul

1937 births
2016 deaths
American women country singers
21st-century American women